Marcos Aurélio Titon (born 19 July 1976), known as Marcão, is a retired Brazilian footballer who last played as a defender and midfielder for Luxembourg National Division club FC Jeunesse Canach.

References

External links

1976 births
Living people
Sportspeople from Paraná (state)
Brazilian footballers
Association football defenders
Ermesinde S.C. players
S.C. Freamunde players
Segunda Divisão players
Brazilian expatriate footballers
Expatriate footballers in Portugal
Expatriate footballers in Luxembourg
Brazilian expatriate sportspeople in Portugal
Brazilian expatriate sportspeople in Luxembourg